Helden is a former municipality and a village in the southeastern Netherlands, located in the province of Limburg. In January 2010 Helden joined with other municipalities to form the new municipality of Peel en Maas.

History 
The village was first mentioned in 1144 as "apud Helden", and means "hill". In 1674, it was sold to Gelderland as an independent heerlijkheid.

After the occupation by Gelderland, helden was sold to Prussia. Under Prussia, Helden had developed a small industry.

Only after the Napolionic wars of 1814 did Helden belong to the Kingdom of the Netherlands. But not for long, because after the Belgium Independence changed Helden with a large part of Limburg to the state of Belgium.

The Catholic St Lambertus Church is a three aisled basilica-like church. The nave and choir date from the 15th century. The church was restored after a fire in 1885. In 1944, the tower which probably dated from the 14th century was blown up. The church was restored between 1952 and 1953, and a more modest tower was added.

Helden was home to 341 people in 1840. It was an independent municipality, however the town hall was located in Panningen. In 2010, it was merged into Peel en Maas.

References

External links
 Official Website
 

Municipalities of the Netherlands disestablished in 2010
Populated places in Limburg (Netherlands)
Former municipalities of Limburg (Netherlands)
Peel en Maas